Romário Porto Valença (born 25 January 1998) is a Brazilian footballer who currently plays as a midfielder for Decisão.

Career statistics

Club

Notes

References

1998 births
Living people
Brazilian footballers
Association football midfielders
Sociedade Esportiva Decisão Futebol Clube players